Highway 43 (AR 43, Ark. 43, and Hwy. 43) is a designation for three north–south state highways in Arkansas. One segment of  runs from Highway 264 in Siloam Springs north into Delaware County, Oklahoma along Oklahoma State Highway 20 (SH-20) to terminate at Missouri Route 43 (Route 43) at the Missouri/Oklahoma/Arkansas tri-point near Southwest City, Missouri. A second segment of  runs northeast from Highway 21 at Boxley to Highway 7 in Harrison.

Route description

Siloam Springs to Missouri

The route begins at AR 264 in Siloam Springs and runs west before turning north and running close to the Oklahoma state line. AR 43 runs through Cherokee City before meeting AR 102 and later AR 72 in Maysville.

After Maysville, AR 43 runs along the Oklahoma state line concurrent with Oklahoma State Highway 20. This continues for approximately  until both routes terminate at Missouri Route 43.

For the northernmost few miles of the overlapping stretch of road AR 43/SH 20 turns toward the west, no longer straddling the state line. For those few miles, Highway 43 is located wholly within the state of Oklahoma but is not apparent to the traveler.

Boxley to Harrison
AR 43 begins at Highway 21 at Boxley, and runs north near the Buffalo National River. The route enters Boone County and serves as the western terminus of AR 206, and the southern terminus of AR 397. AR 43 terminates at AR 7 in south Harrison.

Harrison
The route begins at U.S. Route 65 on the north end of Harrison and runs east to AR 7 north of Harrison.

Major intersections

History

Highway 43 was created in the 1926 Arkansas state highway numbering. The original route was designated as State Road 43 between Boxley and Missouri. The route was truncated at State Road 14 at Lead Hill in 1929. The segment between Lead Hill and Harrison was re-signed as Highway 7 in October 1953 following highway reconstruction. Minor relocations also took place around Lead Hill following construction of Bull Shoals Lake in 1954.

The Arkansas State Highway Commission created a second segment of Highway 43 in Harrison on August 25, 1965.

The Arkansas State Highway Commission created a third segment of Highway 43 on October 27, 1971 following a request from the Siloam Springs Chamber of Commerce to provide consistent numbering between Siloam Springs and Joplin, Missouri by renumbering Highway 99 to match Missouri Route 43.

The new segment was rerouted within Siloam Springs as part of a reorganization of the city's highways on July 17, 1996. The Highway Commission relocated the Highway 43 southern terminus from US 412 to Highway 59 by turning over Mount Olive Street to city maintenance and rerouted Highway 43 over the former Highway 204 (Cheri Whitlock Drive) in exchange for street and drainage improvements along Mount Olive Street.

Siloam Springs spur

It was decommissioned when AR 43 was rerouted along AR 204.

See also

References

External links

 
 AR-43 at Roadklahoma

043
Transportation in Benton County, Arkansas
Transportation in Delaware County, Oklahoma
Transportation in Newton County, Arkansas
Transportation in Boone County, Arkansas